The International Journal of Law and Psychiatry is a bimonthly peer-reviewed medical journal covering forensic psychiatry. It was established in 1978 by Pergamon Press and is currently published by Elsevier on behalf of the International Academy of Law and Mental Health, of which it is the official journal. The editor-in-chief is David Weisstub (Université de Montréal). According to the Journal Citation Reports, the journal has a 2016 impact factor of 1.203.

References

External links

Forensic psychiatry journals
Elsevier academic journals
Publications established in 1978
Bimonthly journals
Academic journals associated with international learned and professional societies
English-language journals